The 2017 FC Ordabasy season is their 15th season in the Kazakhstan Premier League, the highest tier of association football in Kazakhstan, following their promotion from to the Kazakhstan First Division in 2003. Ordabasy will also play in the UEFA Europa League and Kazakhstan Cup.

Season events
On 5 February, Aleksei Petrushin was appointed as the club's new manager, taking over from Bakhtiyar Bayseitov.

Squad

On Loan

Transfers

Winter

In:

Out:

Summer

In:

Out:

Competitions

Kazakhstan Premier League

Results summary

Results by round

Results

League table

Kazakhstan Cup

UEFA Europa League

Qualifying rounds

Squad statistics

Appearances and goals

|-
|colspan="14"|Players away from Ordabasy on loan:

|-
|colspan="14"|Players who left Ordabasy during the season:

|}

Goal scorers

Disciplinary record

Notes

References

External links
Official website
Official VK

FC Ordabasy seasons
Ordabasy